Kyung Hee University (abbreviated to KHU) (Hangul: 경희대학교; Hanja: 慶熙大學校) is a private research university in South Korea with campuses in Seoul and Suwon. Founded in 1949, it is widely regarded as one of the best universities in South Korea. Kyung Hee University is part of the Kyung Hee University System, which offers comprehensive education from kindergarten through graduate school.

As of 2020, about 33,000 students were enrolled in Kyung Hee University. The university consists of 24 undergraduate colleges, 1 general graduate school, 13 specialty graduate schools and 49 auxiliary research institutions. The university offers a study abroad program in partnership with 434 sister universities in 69 countries.

Kyung Hee University is known for its College of Korean Medicine, which is considered a leading school in traditional Korean medicine and other traditional Asian medical practices.

History
Kyung Hee University originated in 1949 as Sin Heung Junior College, a 2-year college. Amid the financial crisis of the Korean War, Young Seek Choue bought the struggling school in 1951 and had it accredited as a 4-year undergraduate college in 1952. In 1954, the graduate school was established. The college was renamed to Kyung Hee University in 1960.

The university hosted the 1968 conference of the International Association of University Presidents, first proposed in 1981 the UN International Day of Peace, organized the 1999 Seoul International Conference of NGOs, held the 2009 World Civic Forum, ran the 2011 UNAI-Kyung Hee International Symposium, and has spearheaded the Global Common Society movement.

In 1993 Kyung Hee received the UNESCO Prize for Peace Education. In 2006, Kyung Hee and the University of Pennsylvania initiated the Penn-Kyung Hee Collaborative Summer Program and two years later, a formal Global Collaborative with Peking, Ritsumeikan, and Moscow State universities, with the cooperation of the United Nations Department of Economic and Social Affairs, and the Conference of NGOs (CoNGO).

Symbols
The university emblem is the Chinese character for "university" (it was changed in 2016 to the symbol of a book) and has a world map in the background. This symbolizes Kyung Hee's vision for globalization as well as an open mind and humanism for the world. The university character mark is visualized through the mane of the Laughing Lion, the torch which sheds light on the truth, and the dove, an international symbol of peace. Sports teams and various university promotional products use the character mark to proliferate Kyung Hee's brand value throughout the world. Magnolia is the official flower of Kyung Hee University and the magnolia logo embodies the qualities that Kyung Hee stands for such as resilience, beauty, generosity, and unity.

Academics

Undergraduate colleges
 College of Humanities
 College of Law
 College of Politics and Economics
 College of Management
 College of Hotel and Tourism Management
 College of Science
 College of Human Ecology
 College of Medicine
 College of Korean Medicine
 College of Dentistry
 College of Pharmacy
 College of Nursing Science
 College of Music
 College of Fine Arts
 School of Dance
 Department of Global Eminence (formerly College of Law)
 College of Engineering
 College of Electronics & Information
 College of Software
 College of Applied Sciences
 College of Life Sciences
 College of International Studies
 College of Foreign Language and Literature
 College of Art & Design
 College of Physical Education
 The School of East-West Medical Science

Graduate schools
 Graduate School (general)
 Graduate School of Business
 Graduate School of Education
 Graduate School of Public Policy and Civic Engagement
 Graduate School of Journalism and Communication
 Graduate School of Physical Education
 Graduate School of Technology Management
 Graduate School of International Legal Affairs
 Graduate School of Pan-Pacific International Studies
 Graduate School of East-West Medical Science
 Graduate Institute of Peace Studies
 Graduate School of Tourism
 Graduate School of Art and Fusion Design
 Professional Graduate School of Medicine
 Professional Graduate School of Dentistry
 Law School
 Graduate School of Biotechnology

Notable academic programs

Traditional Korean medicine
Founded in 1948 as Dongyang College and reorganized in 1965 into the Kyung Hee College of Korean Medicine (KHKM), KHKM is one of eleven Korean medical colleges in the country, dedicated to the study of traditional medical practice. In 1972 its researchers demonstrated a drug-free acupunctural anesthesia. In 1998 Kyung Hee established the International Studies of Korean Medicine to broaden its reach to international scholars. The following year it established the Graduate School of East-West Medicine Science (GSM) in order to blend Eastern and Western diagnostic methods. The College of Korean Medicine and the Graduate School of Medicine have integrated the two traditions within the Kyung Hee Medical Center and active collaboration occurs between the college and the biomedical engineering department on acupuncture therapy, chronic medical conditions, palsy, and geriatric diseases.

The medical center is divided into the General Hospital, Dental Hospital, Korean Medicine Hospital, East-West Medical Center, and the Medical Science Research Institute. In a 1999 study, the Kyung Hee Korean medicine curriculum consisted of 60 percent Eastern and 40 percent Western research and practice.

Physical education
The Dept. of Physical Education at KHU was set up as the Dept. of Physical Education in Korea in 1949, and became a stepping stone to play a pivotal role in Korean Physical education. It was promoted to the college of Physical education upon completing the construction of the largest gym in Asia in 1955. The doctoral program was opened in 1980 for the first ever time in Korea. Currently, five departments are operated within the college of Physical education: Physical Edu, Sports medicine, coaching, Golf management and Taekwondo.

Campus
Kyung Hee University has three campuses. The university's original campus is Seoul Campus (245 acres), located in the Dongdaemun District of Seoul, and established in 1954. In 1979, the university established its second campus, the Global Campus (510 acres) in Yongin, near Suwon. In 1984, the university established its third campus, Gwangneung Campus (12 acres) in Namyangju, just outside of Seoul. Gwangneung Campus is home to the Graduate Institute of Peace Studies.

Facilities

Central Museum
It was opened in October 1955 and later moved to the fourth floor of the central library building in November 1966 when the central library was completed. In 2001, it was registered as the 1st National Museum of Korea (Ministry of Culture and Tourism Registration No. 193) and then recommissioned and computerized the collections and launched the Internet search service in January 2004.

Natural History Museum
Kyung Hee University's Natural History Museum is a museum established and operated by Kyung Hee University. It opened on June 13, 1978, and houses some 70,000 specimens and natural materials such as rocks, minerals, mammals, birds, insects, fish, and plants. Each category includes 1,200 rock and mineral samples, 5,000 bird and mammal samples, 50,000 insect specimens, and 4,000 plant specimens.

Hye Jung Museum
The Hye Jung Museum is the first high-level museum to be established in Korea. From the 11th century to the 20th century, it has the largest collection of materials produced in Korea, including antique maps, lightings, and related historical materials.

Programs

Global Collaborative
The Global Collaborative is a summer program that allows international students to attend classes led by scholars and engage in discussions about global governance and sustainability. The Global Collaborative is co-run by the University of Pennsylvania, Peking University, Ritsumeikan University, and Moscow State University with the cooperation of the United Nations and the Conference of NGOs (CoNGO). Through research, education and modules on global governance, or sustainability and the environment, international students collaborate on research projects.

World Civic Forum
Run as a join initiative with the United Nations Department of Economic and Social Affairs, the World Civic Forum (WCF) is a global institution that brings together academic institutions, international organizations, civil society, governments, the business sector and the media to create programs in education, research and practice related to the challenges of making the world a better place to live. Held concurrently with the World Civic Forum, the World Civic Youth Forum focuses youth on contemporary global issues, civic values, engagement, and action.

Global Service Corps
The Global Service Corps emphasizes peace studies in new forms of public service. Launched in September 2010, effort is placed on volunteering, social responsibility, social services, and regional and global engagement in areas such as rural farming communities, environment protection, and medical treatment of the disadvantaged. The program aims to seek means to address institutional engagement in global problems through research, education and practice, and media. Collaborations are with the United Nations, international NGOs, corporations, and other organizations.

Global Studio Network
The Global Student Network links by the internet diverse institutes and individuals around the world to overcome communication beyond barriers of language and culture. The network works with both local and international organization to encourage discussion. Previous strands have included environmental issues and conflict resolution with the United Nations and UNESCO.

Global Academy for Future Civilizations
The Global Academy for Future Civilizations is a set of international research organizations dedicated to creating a more humane civilization in the 21st century. The program works with the United Nations and other organizations.

United Nations Academic Impact
The university and the United Nations Academic Impact program seek to align institutions of higher education with the United Nations in supporting the principles of the UN in the areas of human rights, literacy, sustainability and conflict resolution. The Academic Impact also asks each participating college or university to demonstrate support of at least one of those principles each year.

Research institutes

Seoul campus
 International Studies of Korean Medicine
 Institute for Human Society
 Research Institute of Social Science
 Research Institute of Humanities
 Research Institute for Educational Affairs
 Institute of Legal Studies
 Institute for Industrial Relations
 Korea Institute of Ornithology
 East-West Medical Research Institute
 Research Institute of Oral Biology
 Institute of Global Environment
 Institute of Korean Medicine
 East-West Nursing Research Institute
 The Contemporary Art Research Institute
 Kohwang Medical Research Institute
 Research Institute of Science for Human Life
 Center for the Study of Languages
 East-West Pharmaceutical Research Institute
 Research Institute of Clinical Nutrition
 Tourism Industry Information Research Center
 Testing and Development Center for Dental Material
 Advanced Display Research Center
 Center for Arts and Cultural Management
 International Center of Speech and Debate
 Healthcare Industry Research Institute
 Age-Related and Brain Diseases Research Center
 Acupuncture and Meridian Science Research Center
 Impedance Imaging Research Center (IIRC)

Global campus
 Institute of Global Affairs
 Center for Cross Culture Studies
 Institute of Social Science and Policy
 Design Research Institute
 Plant Metabolism Research Center
 Impedance Imaging Research Center
 Hye-Jung Cultural Research Institute
 Skin Bio-Technology Center
 Industrial Liaison Research Institute
 Institute of Natural Science
 Institute of Life Science and Resources
 Research Institute of Sports Science
 Institute of Multimedia Technology
 Materials Research Center for Information Display
 Regional Innovation Center-Components and Materials for Information Display

Rankings

For 2020, Kyung Hee University was ranked 6th in South Korea, 40th in Asia, and 247th in the world, according to the QS World University Rankings. The university's Hospitality and Leisure Management program was ranked 50th in the world in 2018, the highest of all of the school's program areas.

Notable alumni

Politics, government and public service
 Moon Jae-in – 12th President of South Korea
 Kim Jung-sook – First Lady of South Korea

Literature and arts
 Han Su-san – author
 Cho Hae-il – author
 Jeong Ho-seung – poet
 Kim Jong-ok – author
 Won Tae-yeon – poet
 Kwak Jae-yong – film director, screenwriter

Sports
 Yeo Hong-chul – gymnast, Olympic silver medalist
 Yun Mi-jin – archer, Olympic gold medalist
 Lee Ho-Suk – short track speedskater, Olympic gold medalist
 Kong Young-il – one of the twelve original masters of taekwondo
 Dai-won Moon – Mexican martial artist, known as the "Father of Mexican Taekwondo"
 Park Jong-hwan – former manager of the South Korean national football team
 Kim Jong-kyu – basketball player
 Lee Woon-jae – football goalkeeper, former member of the South Korean national football team
 Park Kun-ha – former football player, coach of the South Korean national under-23 football team
 Lee Jung-soo – football player
 Lee Ho – football player
 Yoon Kyung-shin – handball player

Entertainment
 Bang Yong-guk (B.A.P)
 Byun Baek-hyun (EXO)
 Cha Hun (N.Flying)
 Cho Hye-ri (Wax)
 Cho Kyu-hyun (Super Junior)
 Cho Yi-hyun
 Choi Whee-sung
 Do Kyung-soo (D.O. of EXO)
 Go Joon-hee
 Gong Yoo
 Han Da-min
 Han Ga-in
 Han Seung-yeon (Kara)
 Hwang Hee
 Hwang Seung-eon
 Hwang Soo-jung
 Hwang Yoon-seok (Hwanhee of Fly to the Sky)
 Im Chang-kyun (I.M of Monsta X)
 Im Hyun-sik
 Im Jung-eun
 Jang Do-yeon
 Jang Seo-hee
 Jang Su-won (Sechs Kies)
 Jeon Ji-yoon (4Minute)
 Jo Kwon (2AM)
 Jun Kwang-ryul
 Jung Yoon-hak
 Jung Ji-hoon (Rain)
 Jung Joon-ho
 Jung Woo
 Kang Dae-sung (Big Bang)
 Kang Min-kyung (Davichi)
 Kang San-eh
 Kang Shin-il 
 Kim Hae-sook
 Kim Hyung-soo (Brother Su)
 Kim In-seong (SF9)
 Kim Ji-seok
 Kim Jong-dae (aka Chen of EXO)
 Kim Jong-wook
 Kim Jun-myeon (Suho of EXO)
 Kim Min-jun (Jun. K of 2PM)
 Kim Nam-joo
 Kim Ok-vin
 Kim Seok-woo (Rowoon of SF9)
 Kim Seol-hyun (AOA)
 Kim So-hyang
 Kim Sun-a
 Kim Sung-ryung
 Kim Tae-ri
 Kim Tae-woo (g.o.d)
 Kim Yi-ji (Kim E-Z)
 Kim Yeon-ji (SeeYa)
 Kim Yoo-ri
 Kim Young-woon (Kangin of Super Junior)
 Kwon Ji-yong (G-Dragon of Big Bang)
 Lee Hae-ri (Davichi)
 Lee Hong-gi (F.T. Island)
 Lee Hyo-ri
 Lee Joo-young
 Lee Ki-chan
 Lee Kyu-hyung
 Lee Ok-joo (Tymee)
 Lee Seung-hyung
 Lee Tae-sun
 Lim Seul-ong (2AM)
 Min Kyung-hoon (Buzz)
 Na Tae-joo
 Ock Joo-hyun
 Oh Min-suk
 Oh Na-ra
 Oh Seung-hoon
 Park Chan-yeol (EXO)
 Park Hyo-shin
 Park Ji-yoon
 Park Na-rae (Spica)
 Park Soo-ah (Lizzy of After School and Orange Caramel)
 Park Soo-jin
 Park Ye-eun (Wonder Girls)
 Park Yoo-chun (JYJ)
 Ryu Hwa-young
 Seo Ji-hoon
 Shim Chang-min (TVXQ)
 Shin Bo-ra
 Sung Yu-ri
 Yoon Doo-joon (Highlight)
 Yoon Eun-hye
 Yoon Kye-sang (g.o.d)

See also
 Education in South Korea
 Kyung Hee Cyber University
 List of universities and colleges in South Korea

References

External links
 Official website (Korean)
 Official website (English)

 
Universities and colleges in Seoul
Universities and colleges in Gyeonggi Province
Traditional Korean medicine
Educational institutions established in 1949
1949 establishments in South Korea
Private universities and colleges in South Korea
Dongdaemun District